Taquaritinga do Norte is a city in the state of Pernambuco, Brazil.

Geography

 State - Pernambuco
 Region - Agreste of Pernambuco
 Boundaries - Paraiba  (N); Caruaru, Toritama and Brejo da Madre de Deus  (S); Vertentes  (E); Santa Cruz do Capibaribe  (W)
 Area - 475.2 km2
 Elevation - 774 m
 Hydrography - Capibaribe River
 Vegetation - Caatinga Hiperxerófila
 Climate - semi arid - hot and dry
 Annual average temperature - 20.9 c
 Distance to Recife - 164 km
 Population - 29,127 (2020)

Economy

The main economic activities in Taquaritinga are based in textile industry, general commerce and agribusiness.

Economic Indicators

Economy by Sector
2006

Health Indicators

References

Municipalities in Pernambuco